The 2023 Mercure Perth Masters were held from 4 to 7 January at the Dewars Centre in Perth, Scotland. The total purse for the event was £ 17,000 on the men's side and £ 7,200 on the women's side.

Men

Teams
The teams are listed as follows:

Round-robin standings
Final round-robin standings

Round-robin results
All draw times are listed in Greenwich Mean Time (UTC+00:00).

Draw 2
Wednesday, 4 January, 6:00 pm

Draw 3
Wednesday, 4 January, 8:30 pm

Draw 4
Thursday, 5 January, 8:00 am

Draw 5
Thursday, 5 January, 10:45 am

Draw 6
Thursday, 5 January, 2:00 pm

Draw 7
Thursday, 5 January, 4:30 pm

Draw 8
Friday, 6 January, 8:30 am

Draw 9
Friday, 6 January, 11:15 am

Draw 10
Friday, 6 January, 2:45 pm

Draw 11
Friday, 6 January, 5:30 pm

Playoffs

Source:

Quarterfinals
Saturday, 7 January, 8:00 am

Semifinals
Saturday, 7 January, 11:00 am

Final
Saturday, 7 January, 3:30 pm

Women

Teams
The teams are listed as follows:

Round-robin standings
Final round-robin standings

Round-robin results
All draw times are listed in Greenwich Mean Time (UTC+00:00).

Draw 1
Wednesday, 4 January, 1:30 pm

Draw 2
Wednesday, 4 January, 6:00 pm

Draw 3
Wednesday, 4 January, 8:30 pm

Draw 4
Thursday, 5 January, 8:00 am

Draw 5
Thursday, 5 January, 10:45 am

Draw 6
Thursday, 5 January, 2:00 pm

Draw 7
Thursday, 5 January, 4:30 pm

Draw 9
Friday, 6 January, 11:15 am

Draw 10
Friday, 6 January, 2:45 pm

Draw 11
Friday, 6 January, 5:30 pm

Draw 12
Friday, 6 January, 9:00 pm

Playoffs

Source:

Quarterfinals
Saturday, 7 January, 8:00 am

Semifinals
Saturday, 7 January, 11:00 am

Final
Saturday, 7 January, 2:00 pm

Notes

References

External links
Official Website
Men's Event
Women's Event

2023 in curling
2023 in Scottish sport
International curling competitions hosted by Scotland
Women's curling competitions in Scotland
Sport in Perth, Scotland
January 2023 sports events in the United Kingdom